James Paul Theakston (born 21 December 1970) is an English television presenter, producer, and actor. He co-presented the former Saturday morning BBC One children's show Live & Kicking, alongside Zoe Ball between 1996 and 1999. He co-hosted BBC One's former music programme Top of the Pops between 1998 and 2003. He currently co-hosts the national breakfast show with Amanda Holden  on Heart Radio. He narrated the BBC documentary series Traffic Cops from 2003 and 2015, and again on Channel 5 from 2016 onwards. He has hosted several television programmes for the BBC, ITV, Channel 4 and Channel 5. He has won a BAFTA for Live & Kicking and numerous awards for his radio work including a SONY GOLD, 3 Silver Awards and 4 Bronze awards, 2 ARQIVA Awards, 3 TRIC awards and 2 New York Radio Festival Awards.

Education
He joined the National Youth Theatre at the age of 13, where he appeared in plays including Murder in the Cathedral and Marat/Sade alongside contemporaries such as Daniel Craig, but he was put off from pursuing a full-time acting career by the financial hardships that he encountered. After leaving  with nine O-Levels and one GCSE in Maths, retaking it at BHASVIC, he attended North London Polytechnic (now London Metropolitan University), from which he graduated with a first class degree in business studies. Whilst at university, he read traffic bulletins on BBC GLR because he wanted to get into sports reporting.

Life and career

Radio
Before embarking on a broadcasting career, he worked for auctioneers Christie's, and planned to study art history at the Courtauld Institute. However, after undertaking football and cricket reports for GLR and Radio 5 Live, he was spotted by the BBC's head of sport and hired to present GLR's Saturday Sport Show at the age of 23. He then presented numerous shows for Radio 5 Live including Sportscall, The Jamie Theakston Cricket Show and Sport on Wednesday. Theakston joined Radio 1 in April 1999 to present the Sunday Lunch show. He fronted the 'One Big Sunday' events during 2000. He moved to a Saturday morning slot in 2001.

He left Radio 1 in 2002 to pursue an acting career, his last show being broadcast on 28 September. He joined London radio station Heart 106.2 in May 2005, replacing Jonathan Coleman on Heart Breakfast with Harriet Scott, which won Gold for Best Music Personality Show at the New York Festivals and the Silver Entertainment Award at the Sony Radio Academy Awards, both in 2007. Theakston (along with Scott) won the Radio Presenter of the Year award at the Arqiva Commercial Radio Awards in June 2009. Scott left Heart Breakfast in 2013; she was replaced by Spice Girl Emma Bunton, who already had a show on the Heart network. Bunton left in 2018.

On 3 June 2019, Heart Breakfast went national across the UK, following a decision by the UK radio regulator OFCOM to reduce local programming requirements. Theakston currently hosts the show alongside Amanda Holden.

Between Bunton’s departure and Holden’s arrival, Heart DJ Lucy Horobin was brought in as a temporary co host for Theakston.

Television
On television, after presenting The O Zone with Jayne Middlemiss, he has most notably hosted Top of the Pops (1998–2003), Live & Kicking (1996–1999) and The Priory. The latter two shows he co-presented alongside Zoë Ball. Theakston featured beside Zoë Ball once again in Channel 5's Britain's Best Brain series, which aired in October 2009.

He has also hosted a number of other shows, including the Channel 4 reality TV show The Games alongside Kirsty Gallacher; game show, Beg Borrow or Steal (2004); prime-time Saturday night show The People's Quiz; Channel 4's The Search; and ITV Saturday night show With A Little Help From My Friends. From July–August 2013, Theakston and Emma Bunton presented ITV's This Morning Summer on Friday mornings.

Theakston's other presenting work includes fronting the Glastonbury Festival coverage for the BBC, the Oscars, the Grammys, A Question of Pop, UK Music Hall of Fame and Guinness World Records. He narrated all episodes of Traffic Cops and its spin-off show Motorway Cops, and since 2015 has narrated episodes of Caught on Camera.

He also played himself in the mock-interview series Rock Profile in which he interviewed "celebrities" impersonated by Matt Lucas and David Walliams, and in the episode "Video Killed the Radio Star" of the TV series FM in March 2009.

Acting
As an actor, Theakston has appeared in shows such as Agatha Christie's Marple and Little Britain. Theakston has acted with Amanda Holden in Mad About Alice (2004) and worked with Adam Faith on the series Murder in Mind in 2003, shortly before Faith's death. He has also starred in the West End in the plays 'Art' and Home and Beauty at the Lyric Theatre, Shaftesbury Avenue.
In 2004, he appeared in Agatha Christie's Miss Marple: Body in the Library.

Personal life
Theakston lived for about ten years in Wings Place, a Tudor mansion in Ditchling, East Sussex. Theakston married Sophie Siegle in Ditchling on 15 September 2007, and they live in west London. They have two children. He was previously romantically linked to socialite Lady Victoria Hervey, actor Joely Richardson, and models Erin O'Connor and Sophie Dahl.

He is a keen fencer and competed for Sussex in 1985. As captain of Ditchling Cricket Club, Theakston was a member of the first cricket team from England to play the Afghan cricket team in Kabul.

He is a member of Mensa, a Patron of Humanists UK and a supporter of Brighton & Hove Albion.

Charity
Theakston took a break in 2003 to travel to Uganda to meet with former child soldiers. He is a patron for CANCERVIVE – a charity established to address the needs of anyone whose family or friends are cancer sufferers.

He played in his fifth successive Soccer Aid match at Old Trafford in June 2014. Having, in 2010, saved four penalties for England against the Rest of the World in a penalty shoot-out, before missing a penalty himself in a defeat, he was later named man of the match for his performance in goal.

On 4 October 2019, Theakston took an 8 day break from Heart Breakfast to set off on his Bike Britain Challenge, a cycling event for Global's charity Make Some Noise. The event lasted 8 days, with Theakston cycling 650 miles from Edinburgh and arriving in London on the 11th. Along the way, he stopped at Newcastle upon Tyne, Leeds, Manchester, Birmingham, Cardiff and Bristol, and met numerous life threatened children and their families.

In June 2022, Theakston gifted his wicket to the bustling medium-pace of Ricky Boardman from Kew Cricket Club's 3rd XI, an event Theakston defined as 'pure theatre'.

Performance credits

Filmography

Television

Radio

References

External links

1970 births
Living people
People from Ditchling
People educated at Hurstpierpoint College
People educated at Lancing College
Alumni of the University of North London
National Youth Theatre members
English atheists
English humanists
English television presenters
English radio DJs
British children's television presenters
Mensans
BBC Radio 1 presenters
Top of the Pops presenters